Donald D. Deshler (born 1947) is a leading expert on the education of special needs children. He is professor emeritus in the School of Education and was the director of the Center for Learning on Education at the University of Kansas. He was also the Gene A. Budig Professor of Special Education at the University of Kansas.

Deshler was born in Butte, Montana. He worked at a junior high school teacher before he became involved in teaching educators and researching on educational practices. Deshler has a bachelor's degree from Whitman College and a masters of education and a Ph.D. from the University of Arizona. He is a member of the Advisory Board of the National Institute for Literacy, and has worked with the Aspen Institute.

Deshler is a member of the Church of Jesus Christ of Latter-day Saints. He served for several years as an Area Seventy in the church and in 2016 was called to serve as president of the Winter Quarters Nebraska Temple, succeeding Theodore H. Okiishi.

Publications 
 Teaching Content to All: Evidence-based Inclusive Practices in Middle and Secondary Schools, co-authored by B. Keith Lenz. 
 Informed Choices for Struggling Adolescent Readers: A Research-based Guide to Instructional Programs and Practices. 
 Teaching Adolescents with Learning Disabilities: Strategies and Methods, co-authored by Edwin S. Ellis and B. Keith Lenz.

References

Living people
1947 births
Area seventies (LDS Church)
Temple presidents and matrons (LDS Church)
University of Arizona alumni
University of Kansas faculty
American leaders of the Church of Jesus Christ of Latter-day Saints
Latter Day Saints from Montana
Latter Day Saints from Washington (state)
Latter Day Saints from Arizona
Latter Day Saints from Kansas